Les Trois Lacs (literally The Three Lakes) is a commune in the department of Eure, northern France. The municipality was established on 1 January 2017 by merger of the former communes of Venables, Bernières-sur-Seine (the seat) and Tosny.

See also 
Communes of the Eure department

References 

Communes of Eure